Yesipovo is a rural locality (a settlement) and the administrative center of Yesipovskoye Rural Settlement, Ternovsky District, Voronezh Oblast, Russia. The population was 1,620 as of 2010. There are 15 streets.

Geography 
Yesipovo is located 15 km northwest of Ternovka (the district's administrative centre) by road. Polyana is the nearest rural locality.

References 

Rural localities in Ternovsky District